Sanat Gaz Sarakhs Football Club is an Iranian football club based in Sarakhs, Iran. The club is owned by National Iranian Oil Company, based in Khangiran, Razavi Khorasan Province and was founded on December 22, 2005.

History

Khorasani Duel
As part of Hazfi Cup, on November 26, 2009 Sanat Gaz faced rival fellow Khorasani team Payam Mashhad F.C. in a game that became known as "Duel of Khorasan" by journalists., the game was played in Takhti Stadium, Mashhad and won by Payam. Hamid Marvi scored the winning goal in 20th minute from the penalty spot and thus Sanat Gaz was eliminated from progressing further in the competition. The game was very physical, two players were red carded, while six other received yellow cards

Head coaches

 ...
 Ramezan Shokri (c.2009)
 Majid Hosseinipour (?-November 2010)
 Reza Sahebi (November 2010–? 2011)

Season-by-Season

The table below shows the achievements of the club in various competitions.

References

See also
 Hazfi Cup

Football clubs in Iran
Association football clubs established in 2005
2005 establishments in Iran